Daniel Köllerer was the defending champion, however he lost to Daniel Brands in the quarterfinal.
Peter Luczak became the new winner, after he beat Juan Pablo Brzezicki in the final 6–2, 6–0.

Seeds

Draw

Final four

Top half

Bottom half

References
 Main draw
 Qualifying draw

2009 ATP Challenger Tour
2009 Singles